James Ferguson Cowan (born 17 May 1929) is a Scottish former first-class cricketer.

Cowan was born in May 1929 at Penicuik, Midlothian. He was educated at George Watson's College, before matriculating to the University of Edinburgh. A club cricketer for Watsonians Cricket Club, Cowan made his debut for Scotland in first-class cricket against Ireland at Paisley in 1960. He played two further first-class matches for Scotland, both against Warwickshire at Edgbaston on Scotland's 1961 and 1962 tours of England. In his three first-class matches, Cowan scored 52 runs at an average of 10.40, with a highest score of 18.

References

External links
 

1929 births
Living people
People from Penicuik
People educated at George Watson's College
Alumni of the University of Edinburgh
Scottish cricketers